The 2014 FIVB Women's World Championship was the seventeenth edition of the competition, contested by the 24 senior women's national teams of the members of the  (FIVB), the sport's global governing body. The final tournament was held from 23 September to 12 October 2014 in Italy.

The United States won their first world title, defeating China in four sets at the final. Reigning Olympic champions Brazil won the 3rd place match, defeating Italy in five sets. Kimberly Hill was selected Most Valuable Player.

Qualification

The regional qualification stage determined the 24 teams competing in the championship competition. Hosts Italy were granted automatic qualification. Regional governing bodies were allocated the remaining 23 spots. Africa was granted two, Asia and Oceania four, North, Central America and Caribbean six, South America two, and Europe ten places (including hosts).

Squads

Venues
The tournament was played at six venues in six cities.

Format
The tournament was played in three different stages (first, second and third rounds). A single round-robin format was played within each group to determine the teams group position, the four best teams of each group (total of 16 teams) progressed to the next round.

The three best teams of each group (total of 6 teams) progressed to the next round.

A single round-robin format was played within each group to determine the teams group position, the two best teams of each group (total of 4 teams) progressed to the semifinals.

Group standing criteria
1. Ranking points (3 points for a 3–0 or 3–1 win; 2 points for a 3–2 win; 1 point for a 2–3 loss; 0 points for a 1–3 or 0–3 loss)
2. Number of wins
3. Sets ratio
4. Points ratio
5. Head to head

Source: FIVB

Pools composition
Teams were seeded in the first three positions of each pool following the Serpentine system according to their FIVB World Ranking. FIVB reserved the right to seed the hosts as head of Pool A regardless of the World Ranking. All teams not seeded were drawn to take other available positions in the remaining lines, following the World Ranking. The drawing was held in Parma, Italy on 10 March 2014. Because NORCECA qualification were in progress on 10 March 2014, FIVB used the best world rankings of NORCECA when the draw was made. Ranking shown in brackets except Hosts which rank 4th.

Results
All times are Central European Summer Time (UTC+02:00).

First round

Pool A
Venue: PalaLottomatica, Rome

|}

|}

Pool B
Venue: PalaTrieste, Trieste

|}

|}

Pool C
Venue: PalaOlimpia, Verona

|}

|}

Pool D
Venue: PalaFlorio, Bari

|}

|}

Second round
The results and points of the matches between the same teams that were already played during the first round were taken into account for the second round.

Pool E
Venues: PalaFlorio, Bari and PalaTrieste, Trieste

|}

|}

Pool F
Venues: PalaOlimpia, Verona and PalaPanini, Modena

|}

|}

Third round
Second round pool winners were placed in each third round pool, while the second and third placed teams were drawn.

Venue: Mediolanum Forum, Milan

Pool G

|}

|}

Pool H

|}

|}

Final round
Venue: Mediolanum Forum, Milan

Semifinals

|}

3rd place match

|}

Final

|}

Final standing

Awards

 Most Valuable Player
  Kimberly Hill
 Best Setter
  Alisha Glass
 Best Outside Spikers
  Zhu Ting
  Kimberly Hill
 Fair Play
  José Roberto Guimarães

 Best Middle Blockers
  Thaísa Menezes
  Yang Junjing
 Best Opposite Spiker
  Sheilla Castro
 Best Libero
  Monica De Gennaro

See also

2014 FIVB Volleyball Men's World Championship

References

External links

 Official website
 FIVB VolleyWorld no. 9 / 2014 (2014 Women's World Championship edition)

 
FIVB Volleyball Women's World Championship
FIVB Volleyball Women's World Championship
FIVB Volleyball Women's World Championship
International women's volleyball competitions hosted by Italy
September 2014 sports events in Europe
October 2014 sports events in Europe
Women's volleyball in Italy